Suphot Dhirakaosal is the Ambassador Extraordinary and Plenipotentiary of the Kingdom of Thailand to the Russian Federation.

Suphot Dhirakaosal studied International Affairs and Law at Thammasat University, Bangkok. After graduating, he joined the Ministry of Foreign Affairs of Thailand in 1973, working locally and in foreign diplomatic missions in Hanoi, Geneva, Rome, and appointed in 1995 as Consul General in Los Angeles.

His first appointment as Ambassador Extraordinary and Plenipotentiary of Thailand was in 2000 to the State of Kuwait.

Dhirakaosal married in 1977, with two children .

References

External links
 Suphot Dhirakaosal, burmalibrary.org

Year of birth missing (living people)
Living people
Suphot Dhirakaosal
Suphot Dhirakaosal
Suphot Dhirakaosal
Suphot Dhirakaosal
Suphot Dhirakaosal